Dejan Ćirjaković (born 13 July 1979) is a Serbian actor, comedian, screenwriter and musician. Together with Nikola Škorić and Dimitrije Banjac he is the creator and actor of several popular Serbian television show programs, including Noćna smena, Velika Srbija, Srbi u Svemiru, Pravi fudbal and Državni posao.

His best known role is Boškić, a young archivist in TV series Državni posao.

Personal life
Dejan Ćirjaković is married and has two children.

Filmography

References

External sources
 

1979 births
21st-century Serbian male actors
Living people
Serbian male television actors
Actors from Novi Sad